Pasco is a station on Line A of the Buenos Aires Underground. The station belonged to the inaugural section of the Buenos Aires Underground opened on 1 December 1913, which linked the stations Plaza Miserere and Plaza de Mayo. Like the Alberti station, it only has one platform, which in this case only serves passengers traveling to Plaza de Mayo. The other platform (the ghost station Pasco Sur) is located just a few meters away, but was closed in 1953 since the proximity of Alberti station meant having so many stops in such quick succession slowed the line's frequency.

Gallery

References

External links

Buenos Aires Underground stations
Balvanera
Railway stations opened in 1913
1913 establishments in Argentina